The Midland Athletic League was an OHSAA athletic league located in northwest Ohio that was formed in 1985. Mark King was the last commissioner.  The league folded following the 2013-14 school year as its members found new league homes.  The last day of league operation was June 30, 2014.

Members

Bettsville, New Riegel and Old Fort never fielded football teams for league play. St. Wendelin's football team competed in the MAL from 1986-2008, then in the Northwest Central Conference for 2009 and 2010. St. Wendelin spent 2011-2013 as a football independent, but since it remained a member of the MAL for every other sport, the MAL kept track of St. Wendelin's football record in the league standings.

League history

1980s
The MAL was created for the 1985-86 school year's basketball season with Bettsville, Hopewell-Loudon, New Riegel, Old Fort and Seneca East coming from the crumbling Seneca County League to combine with North Baltimore and St. Wendelin from the former Lakeshore Conference. Hopewell-Loudon and Seneca East were also full members of the Lakeshore Conference. Tiffin Calvert and St. Joseph agreed to join the league, but were not able to leave the Sandusky Bay Conference until the 1985-86 school year ended.

1990s
Carey and Mohawk leave the North Central Conference and join the MAL for the 1990-91 school year.

2000s
Lakota left the Suburban Lakes League at the end of the 2008-09 school year to join the MAL in all sports in time for the 2009 fall sports season.
St. Wendelin competed in the Northwest Central Conference for football only in 2009 and 2010, but remained a member of the MAL for all other sports. They were eventually voted out of the NWCC for canceling 3 football games in 2010 and competed in the Christian Athletic League of America out of Michigan for football in 2012 and 2013.
On September 8 of 2009, the MAL voted against adding SLL schools Elmwood and Gibsonburg after both submitted letters of interest for membership.

2010s
On December 1, 2011, Carey, Mohawk, and Seneca East announced they would leave the MAL to help form the new Northern 10 Athletic Conference in 2014 with Bucyrus, Buckeye Central, Colonel Crawford, Crestline, Riverdale, Wynford and Ridgedale.
On April 19, 2012, Calvert, Hopewell-Loudon, and North Baltimore also announced they would leave the MAL to join the Blanchard Valley Conference after answering a letter of interest made by the BVC in February 2012. Leaving only two football-playing schools (Lakota and St. Joseph CC) it appeared likely that the MAL would not sponsor the sport anymore.
On May 21, 2012, Hopewell-Loudon and North Baltimore were invited to join the BVC for 2014-15, with responses expected by July 1, 2012. North Baltimore accepted on June 19, 2012 while Hopewell-Loudon accepted a day later. Hopewell-Loudon considered a proposal that would make them dual-members of both the MAL and the BVC for every sport except football.
In July 2012, Lakota sent a letter of inquiry to the TAAC about potential membership. 
In December 2012, North Baltimore decided to participate in both the MAL and BVC for all sports except football, which would have been BVC-only.  This depended on what setup the MAL would have had in the future.
On February 1, 2013, St. Mary Central Catholic High School in Sandusky announced they would be forming a new league called the Sandusky River League in 2014-15 with Calvert, Lakota, New Riegel, Old Fort, and St. Joe's.  This league's intention was to have eight football-playing members and 2-3 non-football schools.  This league would ultimately give a home to the remaining MAL football schools along with New Riegel and Old Fort for all other sports.  Bettsville and St. Wendelin were not initially added to the SRL, but were extended invitations and encouraged to apply. 
On March 19, 2013, St. Wendelin was accepted to join the Sandusky River League as its seventh member for 2014.
On April 4, 2013, it was confirmed that Bettsville would not be admitted to the SRL and would have competed as an independent following the MAL's demise.  In early 2014, Bettsville opted to let Old Fort absorb its district prior to the 2014-15 school year in order to save its district from financial issues.
On May 13, 2013, Tiffin Calvert was unanimously voted in as the 11th member of the TAAC for 2014.  They will join the TAAC without actually competing in the SRL.
As the last calendar day for the 2013-14 school year, June 30, 2014 was the last day the MAL existed as a league.

Boys championships

Girls championships

See also
Ohio High School Athletic Conferences

Notes
St. Wendelin canceled its final two football games of the 2003 season, with Carey and Mohawk, due to low numbers and injuries. Hopewell-Loudon's league record was 6-1, while both Carey and Mohawk wound up 5-1 in the MAL. Since neither Carey nor Mohawk had yet played St. Wendelin but each had just one league loss at the end of the season, league officials decided they and Hopewell-Loudon would share the MAL title.

References

External links
Midland Athletic League home
MAL rejects Elmwood, Gibsonburg bids

Ohio high school sports conferences